Spain competed at the 1978 European Athletics Championships in Prague, then Czechoslovakia, from 29 August to 3 September 1978.

For the first time, a Spanish athlete won a medal in the European Athletics Championships.

Medals

Results

Men
Track & road events

Field events

Women
Track & road events

Nations at the 1978 European Athletics Championships
1978
European Athletics Championships